César Alejandro Huanca Araya (born 4 June 2001) is a Chilean professional footballer who plays as a forward for Huachipato.

References

External links

2001 births
Living people
Association football forwards
Chilean footballers
Deportes Iquique footballers
Chilean Primera División players
C.D. Huachipato footballers
Coquimbo Unido footballers